The 2012 World University Netball Championship was hosted at the Good Hope Centre in Cape Town, South Africa between 2 July and 7 July 2012. The tournament was organised by the Fédération Internationale du Sport Universitaire and University Sport South Africa.  
It was the inaugural tournament of the World University Netball Championship. It was won by Great Britain who defeated the host nation, South Africa 53–49 in the final. Jamaica finished third after defeating Northern Ireland 41–30 in the bronze medal match.

Participants
Initially, eighteen countries indicated that they would send teams. However by June 2012, when the draw was made for the tournament, only seven had confirmed their participation. These were South Africa, Great Britain, Northern Ireland, Jamaica, Namibia, Uganda and the United States.  Australia and New Zealand where among the countries that had dropped out.  Before the tournament started, a late entry by Zimbabwe saw the number of participants increase to eight.  It was initially planned that Ireland would send an All-Ireland team, featuring players from both Northern Ireland and the Republic of Ireland. However no players from the Republic were selected for the final squad. As a result, it was a Northern Ireland team, in effect, that competed in the tournament.

Format
When there was just seven teams due to participate, it was planned for all seven teams to play each other once in a group stage. The top four teams would then qualify for the semi-finals. However with the addition of Zimbabwe it was decided to split the eight teams into two groups of four. All eight teams qualified for the quarter-finals, with the final group tables deciding the quarter-final draw.

Matches

Group A

Group B

Quarter-finals

Semi-finals

Placement matches

7th place

5th place

Bronze medal match

Final

Final placings

References

2012
2012 in netball
International netball competitions hosted by South Africa
2012 in South African women's sport
2012 in British women's sport
2012 in Irish women's sport
2012 in Northern Ireland sport
2012 in Jamaican sport
2012 in American women's sports
2012 in Namibian sport
2012 in Ugandan sport
2012 in Zimbabwean sport
July 2012 sports events in Africa
Sports competitions in Cape Town